Steinkamp is a surname. Notable people with the surname include:

Fredric Steinkamp (1928–2002), American film editor
Jennifer Steinkamp (born 1958), American installation artist
William Steinkamp (born 1953), American film editor
Tyler Steinkamp (born 1995), American internet personality